Senator Gray or Grey may refer to:

Algernon Sidney Gray (1814–1878), Virginia State Senate
Andrew Gray (senator) (died 1849), Delaware State Senate
Benjamin E. Grey (1809–1875), Kentucky State Senate
Bob Gray (South Dakota politician) (born 1971), South Dakota State Senate
E. Arthur Gray (1925–2007), New York State Senate
Edwin Gray (1743–after 1815), Virginia State Senate
Elmon T. Gray (1925–2011), Virginia State Senate
Frederick Thomas Gray (1918–1992), Virginia State Senate
Garland Gray (1902–1977), Virginia State Senate
George Gray (senator) (1840–1925), U.S. Senator from Delaware
Gordon Gray (politician) (1909–1982), North Carolina State Senate
Henry Gray (politician) (1816–1892), Louisiana State Senate
Isaac P. Gray (1828–1895), Indiana State Senate
James A. Gray Jr. (1889–1952), North Carolina State Senate
Linda Gray (politician) (born 1939), Arizona State Senate
Ninian Edwards Gray (1807–1859), Kentucky State Senate
Peter W. Gray (1819–1874), Texas State Senate
Rick Gray (Arizona politician) (fl. 2010s), Arizona State Senate
Ted Gray (politician) (born 1927), Ohio State Senate
William Gray (Massachusetts politician) (1750–1825), Massachusetts State Senate
William Henry Grey (1829–1888), Arkansas State Senate

See also
Elvi Gray-Jackson (born 1953), Alaska State Senate